John Hamilton House, also known as the Hamilton House, is a historic home located at Shelbyville, Shelby County, Indiana. It was built in 1853, and is a -story, rectangular, Italianate style brick dwelling.  It has a slate roof and sits on a limestone block foundation.  The front facade features segmental arched windows, and two two-story projecting polygonal bays flanking a semi-circular one-story porch supported by Doric order columns added about 1910.

It was listed on the National Register of Historic Places in 1979. It is located in the West Side Historic District.

References

Houses on the National Register of Historic Places in Indiana
Italianate architecture in Indiana
Houses completed in 1853
Buildings and structures in Shelby County, Indiana
National Register of Historic Places in Shelby County, Indiana
Historic district contributing properties in Indiana